is a Japan-exclusive video game for multiple platforms in 1986. This video game is the spiritual sequel to an arcade game known as Baluba-Louk No Densetsu, which was also only released in Japan.

Gameplay

Jason, the game's main protagonist is sent to rescue Princess Laira, the daughter of Aighina (Aigiina). She is the only one knows how to use Aura Stars; which must be collected in five dungeons and re-united in the sixth. Players have to kill enough enemies to uncover a ladder in order to progress. Some stages also contain secrets and may have additional methods to continue in the game.

Passwords are available; allowing players the option of skipping the earlier portions.

A very early version of a partial English patch for a NES version was released before the translation project was completed. However, the project never saw completion. However, the game would eventually be ported onto the Commodore 64 in all regions outside Japan.

A North American NES release was planned for 1988 and a fully translated prototype exists.

References

External links
Aigina's Prophecy at MobyGames

1986 video games
Commodore 64 games
Nintendo Entertainment System games
Platform games
Single-player video games
Software Creations games
Vic Tokai games
Video games scored by Tim Follin
Video games developed in Japan